James Harvey (August 10, 1929 – April 2020) was an American film critic and writer. His work was published in the New York Review of Books and the Threepenny Review.

Biography
James Harvey was born on 10 August 1929 in Chicago, Illinois. He studied at Loyola University of Chicago and graduated with A.B. in 1951. In 1954, he received an M.A. in politics from the University of Michigan.

During his career, he served as a professor of English at Stony Brook University until 1994. He also taught at the New School and Sarah Lawrence College.

Books
 Romantic Comedy in Hollywood: From Lubitsch to Sturges (1987)
 Movie Love in the Fifties (2001)
 Watching Them Be: Star Presence on the Screen From Garbo to Balthazar (2014)

Awards
 Hopwood Award

References

1929 births
2020 deaths
American film critics
University of Michigan alumni